In molecular biology, D-stereospecific aminopeptidase (D-aminopeptidase)  is an enzyme which catalyses the release of an N-terminal D-amino acid from a peptide, Xaa-|-Yaa-, in which Xaa is preferably D-Ala, D-Ser or D-Thr. D-amino acid amides and methyl esters also are hydrolyzed, as is glycine amide.

It is a dimeric enzyme with each monomer being composed of three domains. Domain B is organised to form a beta barrel made up of eight antiparallel beta strands. It is connected to domain A, the catalytic domain, by an eight-residue sequence, and also interacts with both domains A and C via non-covalent bonds. Domain B probably functions in maintaining domain C in a good position to interact with the catalytic domain. Domain C is organised to form a beta barrel made up of eight antiparallel beta strands. It is connected to domain B by a short linker sequence, and interacts extensively with the domain A, the catalytic domain. The gamma loop of domain C forms part of the wall of the catalytic pocket; domain C is in fact thought to confer substrate and inhibitor specificity to the enzyme.

External links
MEROPS family S12

References

Protein domains
EC 3.4.11